Bharathi Women's Arts and Science College, is a women's general degree college located in Thachur, Kallakurichi, Tamil Nadu. It was established in the year 1997. The college is affiliated with Thiruvalluvar University. This college offers different courses in arts, commerce and science.

Accreditation
The college is  recognized by the University Grants Commission (UGC).

References

External links

Educational institutions established in 1997
1997 establishments in Tamil Nadu
Colleges affiliated to Thiruvalluvar University
Academic institutions formerly affiliated with the University of Madras